A chaos deity is a deity or more often a figure or spirit in mythology associated with or being a personification of primordial chaos. The following is a list of chaos deities in various mythologies.

Africa and the Middle East

Afroasiatic Middle East

Arabian 
 Falak
 Hinn and Binn

Canaanite
 Yam, god of the sea and primordial chaos
 Tannin (monster)

Egyptian 
 Apep the ultimate evil of Egyptian mythology in snake form
 Isfet chaos, disorder, and injustice - opposed to Maat
 Nu (mythology) primordial waters
 Set (deity) was not originally evil, but developed into a hated figure thanks to the invading Hyksos who identified him with their chief god, fights Apep.

Hebrew 
 Leviathan (is referred to as a reptilian aquatic animal in the Bible, but has also been used as an image of Satan).

Mesopotamian 
 Tiamat

Western Eurasia

Celtic
 Fomorians – monstrous Irish sea-demons deposed by the Tuatha dé Danann

Norse-Germanic 
 Midgard Serpent
 Nidhogg
 Surtr
 Ymir

Graeco-Roman 
 Chaos (mythology), the "first thing that came into being" according to Hesiod
 Dionysus, in some cases thought to be a god of chaos
 Eris
 Hydra (mythology)
 Typhon

Western Asia

Anatolian - Hittite 
 Illuyanka

Hindu-Vedic 
 Vritra

Persian Zorostarian 
 Angra Mainyu, Zoroastrian god of evil and opposed to Ahura Mazda, god of good
Manichaeism
 Prince of Darkness

Asia-Pacific / Oceania
 Amatsumikaboshi, Japanese

Native Americas
 Cipactli
 Juracán
 Tau (mythology)
 Unhcegila

See also
 God of destruction (disambiguation)

References

External links
 

 
Lists of deities